Stephen Allen (July 2, 1767 – July 28, 1852) was an American politician from New York.

Biography

Orphaned by the death of his parent(s) in the Revolutionary War, Allen grew to become a wealthy sailmaker.

He was the 55th Mayor of New York City from December 1821 to 1824, first appointed by the Council of Appointment in 1821, and then elected by the Board of Aldermen in 1823 and 1824.

He was a member of the New York State Assembly (New York Co.) in 1826.

He was a member of the New York State Senate (1st D.) from 1829 to 1832, sitting in the 52nd, 53rd, 54th and 55th New York State Legislatures.

In 1835, the same year as the Great Fire of New York, Allen moved to 1 Washington Square North, and led the commission that very quickly rebuilt New York's commercial center.

He died in the Henry Clay steamboat disaster on July 28, 1852 on the Hudson River near Riverdale in what was later called the Bronx and was buried at the New York City Marble Cemetery.

See also
List of mayors of New York City

References

Sources
List of Mayors at NYC website
It Happened in Washington Square by Emily Kies Folpe (2002, Johns Hopkins University Press),  
The New York Civil List compiled by Franklin Benjamin Hough (pages 127ff, 138, 204, 255 and 428; Weed, Parsons and Co., 1858)

External links

1767 births
1852 deaths
Mayors of New York City
Burials at New York City Marble Cemetery
Members of the New York State Assembly
New York (state) state senators
New York (state) Democratic-Republicans
New York (state) Jacksonians
19th-century American politicians
Accidental deaths in New York (state)
Deaths due to ship fires
Deaths from fire in the United States
Sailmakers